Vania Dantas Leite (13 August 1945 – 10 August 2018) was a Brazilian composer, pianist, electronic musician, conductor and music educator.

Life
Vania Dantas Leite was born in Rio de Janeiro, Brazil, and studied composition with Frederico Egger and piano with Zila de M. Brito at the Escola Nacional de Musica. In 1974 she began to study electronic music and purchased equipment from Electronic Music Studio in London. She established a private laboratory in Rio de Janeiro and began to participate in European and American festivals as a composer of electronic music.

In 1981 she took a teaching position at the Federal University of the State of Rio de Janeiro, where she founded and served as director of the Studio for Electroacoustic Music of the Villa-Lobos Institute (SE-FIR).

Honors and awards
1972-1st place National Composition Contest
1973-3rd place International Conducting Competition
1996-Rio de Janeiro RJ - Award Scholarship Program

Works
Selected works include:
((+ - = -))
+ & - ?
Jur-A-Amo?
Caleidocosmos
Canto de Orfeo
Cycles
Di-stances
Fantasy of Brazil - Eguns?
Fantasy of Brazil - Osanyin?
Karisma
L'Indien et l'Owino
Orpheus Forest
Spectral Landscapes
Palavrasons
Piano Memory
Sforzato / Piano
I want you Green
Vita Vitae
((X))
((Y))
Harmony of Spaces

References

1945 births
Living people
20th-century classical composers
Brazilian music educators
Women classical composers
Brazilian classical composers
Women music educators
20th-century women composers